Bilal Kelvin Fawaz (born 3 April 1988) is a UK-based professional boxer of mixed Lebanese and Benin origin. He came to England when he was 14 years old. He was crowned the Amateur Boxing Association of England light middleweight champion. He has represented England internationally six times. He is variously credited as Bilal Fawaz or Kelvin Fawaz and in artistic output as NaijaBoy and as State Lezz.

Biography
Fawaz was born in Nigeria to a mother who was an immigrant from Benin and a father of Lebanese origin who didn't have Nigerian citizenship either. Fawaz says he had a difficult childhood. His mother abused him and his father took him away eventually leaving him with an "uncle", a relative or a family friend in Lagos. When Fawaz was 14, his "uncle" decided to take him to London, England "to reunite" him with his father. His mother had already been murdered in religious riots. Fawaz stayed in the UK starting age 14 on temporary permits without immigration papers ever since. On arriving in London in 2002, Fawaz was put with a family who he says regularly abused him trafficking him into "domestic servitude". After escaping the foster family at age 15, the British social services public system put him in a group foster home in west London until he turned 16, then moving him to a halfway house for older teenagers. Both his parents were dead. Eventually he was granted temporary leave to remain in the UK until the age of 18 and has been illegality in the UK ever since.

Fawaz began to train as an amateur boxer. He got his start in boxing through a sports day event at Brunel University in west London. After a few months, he moved to the All Stars gym, a long-running local club with a reputation for working with troubled young men. He married in 2011 but the marriage eventually broke down in 2014. He has received a National diploma in Sports science. In early 2012, he won the Amateur Boxing Association (ABA) national championships, becoming light middleweight champion of England. He later held the London middleweight title. He acquired championship belts in three different weight classes. He represented England internationally for six times including against Nigeria, Germany, Sweden, Ireland etc. He was considered for Team GB for both the 2012 and 2016 Olympics, but was unable join in because he had no British passport. In 2014, the English boxing manager and promoter Frank Warren offered Fawaz a professional contract. But he was forced to turn the reported £200,000 down because of his immigration status forbidding him any legal income. He is trained and managed by Aamir Ali the owner of Stonebridge Boxing Club in Willesden, London Borough of Brent. Fawaz also helps youngsters in the gym training them in boxing.

For more than a decade, the British authorities have tried to deport Fawaz. He applied and appealed for extended leave to remain; he also applied for a spousal visa; and in one case asked to be registered as stateless person. All these requests were turned down by the Home Office, which considers his presence in the UK undesirable. In 2017, UK's Home Office attempted to deport him to Nigeria through a programme called Operation Nexus, a joint initiative between UK police forces and immigration enforcement. He was arrested on the premises of Stonebridge Boxing Club where he was living for a while surviving on donations and sponsorship from the club. On 29 November 2017, at age 29, he was arrested and put in Tinsley House immigration removal centre in Gatwick for 5 weeks. Fawaz was released on bail on 2 January 2018 by an immigration tribunal appeals judge, and after a public outcry and a petition demanding his release with 117,000 signatures collected. The Labour MP for Hayes and Harlington John McDonnell and England Boxing both appealed to the authorities on the boxer's behalf. He has to sign-in weekly with the immigration authorities.

Adopting the artistic name NaijaBoy, Bilal Fawaz has also released a number of recordings and music videos including "Did You See" in 2017 and "I'm Ready", "What More Do You Need" and "Body on Me" in 2018 as NaijaBoy. Under the alternative name State Lezz, he released a cover of "Mi Gente" in 2017, "Smoke and Juice", "You Know You Want It" and "What You Mean"  in 2018 and "Wakanda", "My Layer" and "My Layer" in 2019.
On 12th February 2022 Fawaz made his professional boxing debut at York Hall, London scoring a TKO win in the 3rd round.

References

External links
Bilal Fawaz YouTube channel

1988 births
Living people
Nigerian male boxers
Nigerian people of Lebanese descent
Nigerian people of Beninese descent
Sportspeople of Lebanese descent
Nigerian expatriate sportspeople in the United Kingdom
Light-middleweight boxers